Maj. David Graham House, also known as Cedar Run Farm, is a historic home located at Fosters Falls, Wythe County, Virginia. The house was built in four sections, beginning about 1840 and finishing about 1890.  As such its design details reflect styles from late Federal to orientalized Queen Anne. The house is a -story, "T"-shaped, wood and brick structure of immense proportions. It is topped by a hipped roof with dormers and features a short hipped roofed tower. Also on the property are the contributing office and commissary, spring house, kitchen, and two barns.

It was listed on the National Register of Historic Places in 1985.

References

Houses on the National Register of Historic Places in Virginia
Federal architecture in Virginia
Queen Anne architecture in Virginia
Houses completed in 1890
Houses in Wythe County, Virginia
National Register of Historic Places in Wythe County, Virginia